As of January 2023, Luxair serves the following scheduled destinations:

Destinations

References 

Lists of airline destinations